Moi les hommes, je les déteste (English: I Hate Men) is a misandric essay by the French writer Pauline Harmange, a feminist activist from Lille. It was published in 2020, initially by the micropublisher Monstrograph, and later by a major publishing company, Éditions du Seuil.

Contents 
In the 96-page booklet, Harmange aims to "understand misandry and to give it back the right to exist." According to her, feminists have always needed to pretend not to hate men so as not to lose them as allies. But in her view, misandry is not only "perfectly justified, but also necessary". She advises women to reduce their relationships with men and toxic masculinity, in order to rediscover the benefits of the "sisterhood" among women.

Publication history 
In September 2020, Mediapart reported that Ralph Zurmély, a special adviser to the French ministry for gender equality, wrote to the publisher demanding a retraction of the essay, threatening criminal prosecution for "incitement to hatred on the grounds of gender". Monstrograph refused to do so, and the government disavowed Zurmély's demand as a "personal initiative".

The French media response to the attempt at censorship was largely negative. NouvelObs called it an example of "cancel culture" and wrote that the state had not so far attempted to suppress the publication of misogynist texts.

In an example of the Streisand effect, the controversy led to skyrocketing demand for the book, which had initially been printed in only 400 copies. It was republished by a major publisher, Éditions du Seuil, in October 2020.

In 2021, HarperCollins released an English translation of the work by Natasha Lehrer, titled I Hate Men.

References

External links 

2020 essays
Censorship in France
Éditions du Seuil books
French essays
Misandry
Radical feminist books